The free offer of the Gospel, sometimes called the well-meant offer of the gospel, in Christian theology, is the offer of salvation in Jesus Christ to all people. It is generally accepted by Calvinists, but rejected by a few small Reformed denominations, such as the Evangelical Presbyterian Church in Australia, the Protestant Reformed Churches in America, the Reformed Congregations in the Netherlands (Dutch: Gereformeerde Gemeenten in Nederland, abbreviated GGiN) and also by some English Strict Baptists of longer standing, such as John Gill and, later, the Gospel Standard Strict Baptists. 

The free offer of the Gospel was a point that the Marrow Brethren sought to defend, seeing the high Calvinists who denied the doctrine as misguided.

See also

Hyper-Calvinism

References

External links
  "The Free Offer of the Gospel: Is It Biblical and Reformed?" from Free Church Witness
 "Calvinists and the Free Offer of the Gospel" - primary source quotations compiled by Colin Maxwell
 "Murray on the Free Offer: A Review by Matthew Winzer"
 "History of the Free Offer"
 "Is Denial of the 'Well-Meant Offer' Hyper-Calvinism?"
 "A History of Hypo-Calvinism"
 "The Banner of Truth vs. Calvinism"
 "God Makes a Wish: That Each and Every Sinner Might Be Saved" - A Brief Essay by Robert Gonzales Jr. 
Calvinist theology
Homiletics
Hyper-Calvinism
Christian terminology